Pseudalecia is a genus of beetles in the family Buprestidae, containing the following species:

 Pseudalecia brasiliensis Thery, 1923
 Pseudalecia goyazensis Obenberger, 1958

References

Buprestidae genera